The Sri Vadapathira Kaliamman Temple is a temple located at Little India in Singapore.

History 

The temple is believed to have started around 1830s with a picture of the goddess, under a tree near the current site of the temple.

The presiding deity, Sri Vadapathira Kaliamman is believed to originate from Sri Nisumbha Soodhani  , worshipped by Chola kings as the family goddess for protection during war. The goddess was often recognised as the female counterpart to Brihadeeshwarar temple in Thanjavur. The goddess is also referred to as Rahukala Kaliamman or as Vada Bhadra Kaliamman, hence the reference to the goddess.

In 1984, the temple underwent renovation and held a 48 days consecration ceremony. The renovation included two 4.2m statues of Garuda and Hanuman, said to be the first in Singapore and also Asia, at the entrance of the temple.

The 6th Maha Kumbabishegam for Sri Vadapathira Kaliamman Temple was held on 9 December 2016 bringing in additional deities like Jambulingeswarar (Lord Shiva), Akhilandeswari, Chandikeswarar, Navagraham, Swarnakrashna Bhairavar, Lakshmi Kuberar, Lakshmi Narasimar, Nandikeswarar and Veerabathirar.

This temple also has a popular Shirdi Sai Baba mandir in it visited by devotees every day.

In 2015, the temple underwent renovations. On 9 December 2016, the temple held a consecration ceremony after the $2 million renovations were done.

See also

 List of Hindu temples in Singapore

References

External links 
 

Hindu temples in Singapore
Tourist attractions in Singapore